This is a list of episodes for the twelfth season (1961–62) of the television version of The Jack Benny Program.

Episodes

References
 
 

1961 American television seasons
1962 American television seasons
Jack 12